Albert Kenton Campbell (June 10, 1926 – October 6, 1999) was an American professional basketball player. He played in the National Basketball League for the Hammond Calumet Buccaneers during the 1948–49 season and averaged 5.0 points per game. He played both football and basketball at the University of Kentucky.

References

External links
Big Blue History profile

1926 births
1999 deaths
American men's basketball players
Basketball players from Ohio
Forwards (basketball)
Hammond Calumet Buccaneers players
Kentucky Wildcats football players
Kentucky Wildcats men's basketball players
Players of American football from Ohio